William Porter (by 1526 – 1592/93?) was an English politician.

He was a Member (MP) of the Parliament of England for Grantham in 1555, Bletchingley in 1559 and Helston in 1563.

References

1590s deaths
English MPs 1555
English MPs 1559
English MPs 1563–1567
Members of the pre-1707 English Parliament for constituencies in Cornwall
Year of birth uncertain